Christian Lamhauge Holst (born 25 December 1981) is a retired Danish/Faroese football player and is currently working as specific coach at BK Frem.

He played for the Faroe Islands national football team.

Club career
A striker, Holst started his career at Danish lower division teams Thurø and Svendborg before moving to Lyngby Boldklub in 2003. In 2004, he was named Profile of the Year in the Danish 2nd Division by the Danish Football Players Association (Spillerforeningen).
He joined Silkeborg IF on a free transfer in summer 2008.

International career
Holst made his debut for the Faroe Islands in 2003, being born to a Danish father and a Faroese mother., only to be selected again in 2007 to play in European Championship qualifying matches against the likes of Italy, Scotland and Ukraine. He has collected 50 caps, scoring 6 goals.

Coaching career

Hvidovre IF
In August 2016, Holst was hired as forward coach at Hvidovre IF.

BK Frem
On 20 April 2017 it was confirmed, that Holst was the new 'specific coach' at BK Frem.

International goals
Scores and results list Faroe Islands' goal tally first.

References

  Lyngby Boldklub
  "Noter: Sport" (28 August 2003) Politiken, S2P10
  Spillerforeningen
  Faroe Islands – Record International Players – RSSSF
Fremad A. siger farvel til angriber og assistent‚ bold.dk, 16 June 2016

External links
 Superliga Profile

1981 births
Living people
Danish men's footballers
Faroese footballers
Faroe Islands international footballers
Lyngby Boldklub players
Silkeborg IF players
Danish Superliga players
Danish 1st Division players
SfB-Oure FA players
People from Svendborg
Association football forwards
Sportspeople from the Region of Southern Denmark